Belsano is an unincorporated community in Cambria County, Pennsylvania, United States. Belsano has a post office with ZIP code 15922, which opened on February 8, 1876.

References

Unincorporated communities in Cambria County, Pennsylvania
Unincorporated communities in Pennsylvania